Nompatelize is a commune in the Vosges department in Grand Est in northeastern France.

This is a reference to the hilly territory in which the village is located and which at one time was owned by the nearby Étival Abbey. "Ban" is an old word for a territory while "haut" (high) is a reference to the uneven topography.

Geography
The commune occupies an ancient volcanic plateau which has been coated at the edges with Permian sandstone deposits which become thicker to the south and east in the Permian basin of Saint-Dié.

The commanding position of the little plateau, between the valleys of the Meurthe and of the Valdange provides remarkable views towards Raon-l'Étape and Saint-Dié-des-Vosges respectively to the north and to the east, accessible to motorists travelling along the departmental road RD32 which connects Saint-Dié with the Haut du Bois Pass and the road to Rambervillers.

A principal source of employment is a car parts plant owned by the Faurecia company.

See also
Communes of the Vosges department

References

Communes of Vosges (department)